Ubiquitin specific peptidase 38 is a protein that in humans is encoded by the USP38 gene.

References

Further reading